Maharlika Manila Football Club, commonly referred to as Maharlika, is a Filipino professional football club  based in Manila that competes in the Philippines Football League.

The club was founded in 2019 as an all-star seven-a-side team that competed in the 7's Football League. The professional team was formed in 2020 amid the COVID-19 pandemic. The club was co-founded by former Philippines national team defender Anton del Rosario.

History

Seven-a-side team (2019)
Former Philippine national team defender Anton del Rosario announced that to open his 7's Football League's 2019 season, the league would be launching a new competition called the Kampeon Cup 2019. The competition was held from July 27 to 28 at the McKinley Hill Stadium in Taguig, and featured all-star 7-a-side squads from Manila, Bacolod, Cebu City, and Davao City. The team based in Manila was Maharlika F.C.

Several Philippines Football League (PFL) standouts played for the club during the Kampeon Cup, including former Ilocos United goalkeeper Cedric Hodreal, former Kaya and Philippine national team defender Aly Borromeo, Mendiola midfielders Hamed Hajimehdi and Roberto Corsame, and Philippine Air Force stalwart Alexander Elnar. The team had noted Philippine celebrities in its squad such as Nico Bolzico, husband of actress Solenn Heussaff, and Brazilian-Japanese model Daniel Matsunaga. 

During the Kampeon 7s Cup in 2019, Maharlika faced all-star clubs from around the Philippines and finished second out of four clubs in the group stage. In the final, it lost 5-3 to the Cebu all-star team, Cebu Leylam FC, with Hajimehdji, Del Rosario, and Borromeo scoring the goals. The team was also planned to join the Kampeon 7s Cup 2020 in Cebu featuring clubs from Davao, Bacolod, Cebu, and Iloilo City from March 13 to 15, However, due to the COVID-19 Pandemic, the competition was cancelled.

Philippines Football League (2020–)
On July 27, the Facebook and Instagram pages of Maharlika were created, leading to exciting new rumours of the formation of a new club. The club began engaging its fans by asking them questions regarding topics such as player signings and sustainability. On July 30, the club opened its doors to training via Zoom. Pictures of these training sessions were later posted, revealing Del Rosario alongside a set of younger football players as well as many former United Football League and Philippines Football League veterans such as former Kaya-Iloilo players Serge Kaole and Alfred Osei, Hodreal, who played for Maharlika in the Kampeon 7s Cup, former Manila Nomads Sports Club player Mateo Yuhico, and former Global keeper Enrique Ortiz.

On August 6, during a livestream on the Facebook page of Sports On Air, Del Rosario revealed that Maharlika was applying for a license to be able to join the PFL as early as the 2020 season. Should they not participate in this year's season, they were open to join the 2020 season of the Weekend Futbol League. He also stated that he doesn't want to commit just yet, given the COVID-19 pandemic in the Philippines. The team's lineup wasn't revealed either, but it is hinted by Del Rosario to contain former Azkals players, former football players, and some youth players. Brazilian-Japanese model Daniel Matsunaga is one of those who is part of the lineup.  On August 9, Misagh Bahadoran hinted that he had joined Maharlika Football Club, stating that the club had the mentality of former Azkals' players.

On September 1, Maharlika was granted a provisional license allowing it to participate in the PFL's 2020 season. On September 22, 2020, Maharlika formally partnered with the Manila city government and were formally endorsed by Mayor Isko Moreno.

Maharlika's first-ever PFL match took place on October 28 at the PFF National Training Centre, where they lost 1–0 to Kaya–Iloilo. On their following match, on October 31, Maharlika scored their first-ever PFL goal, with Jose Montelibano scoring against Stallion Laguna. That same match was also their first-ever PFL win, which ended 2–1 courtesy of winger Jeremy Theuer.

In February 2023, the McKinley Hill Stadium in Taguig was approved by the PFL as the club's home stadium.

Team image
Maharlika Manila F.C. markets itself as the "Koponan ng Masa" and adopts the motto of "For the people, by the people, we are the People's Club". The club's crest was designed by Augustino Cabral of Southside Football with its  own nickname featured at the bottom using baybayin script. The club is named after a feudal warrior class of the ancient Tagalog society in Luzon during the pre-colonial era.

Kit manufacturers and sponsors

Players

First team squad

Coaching staff
As of 30 July 2021

Head coaches

Records and statistics

Notes

References

External links

2020 establishments in the Philippines
Association football clubs established in 2020
Football clubs in the Philippines
Maharlika F.C.